Maritime transport (or ocean transport) or more generally waterborne transport, is the transport of people (passengers) or goods (cargo) via waterways. Freight transport by sea has been widely used throughout recorded history. The advent of aviation has diminished the importance of sea travel for passengers, though it is still popular for short trips and pleasure cruises. Transport by water is cheaper than transport by air or ground, but significantly slower for longer distances. Maritime transport accounts for roughly 80% of international trade, according to UNCTAD in 2020.

Maritime transport can be realized over any distance by boat, ship, sailboat or barge, over oceans and lakes, through canals or along rivers. Shipping may be for commerce, recreation, or military purposes. While extensive inland shipping is less critical today, the major waterways of the world including many canals are still very important and are integral parts of worldwide economies. Particularly, especially any material can be moved by water; however, water transport becomes impractical when material delivery is time-critical such as various types of perishable produce. Still, water transport is highly cost effective with regular schedulable cargoes, such as trans-oceanic shipping of consumer products – and especially for heavy loads or bulk cargos, such as coal, coke, ores, or grains. Arguably, the industrial revolution had its first impacts where cheap water transport by canal, navigations, or shipping by all types of watercraft on natural waterways supported cost-effective bulk transport.

Containerization revolutionized maritime transport starting in the 1970s. "General cargo" includes goods packaged in boxes, cases, pallets, and barrels. When a cargo is carried in more than one mode, it is intermodal or co-modal.

Description 

A nation's shipping fleet (variously called merchant navy, merchant marine, or merchant fleet) consists of the ships operated by civilian crews to transport passengers or cargo from one place to another. Merchant shipping also includes water transport over the river and canal systems connecting inland destinations, large and small. For example, during the early modern era, cities in the Hanseatic League began taming Northern Europe's rivers and harbors. Similarly, the Saint Lawrence Seaway connects the port cities on the Great Lakes in Canada and the United States with the Atlantic Ocean shipping routes, while the various Illinois canals connect the Great Lakes and Canada with New Orleans. Ores, coal, and grains can travel along the rivers of the American Midwest to Pittsburgh or to Birmingham, Alabama.  Professional mariners are known as merchant seamen, merchant sailors, and merchant mariners, or simply seamen, sailors, or mariners. The terms "seaman" or "sailor" may also refer to a member of a country's martial navy.

According to the 2005 CIA World Factbook, the total number of merchant ships of at least 1,000 gross register tons in the world was 30,936. In 2010, it was 38,988, an increase of 26%, across many countries. , a quarter of all merchant mariners were born in the Philippines.

Liners and tramps 
A ship may also be categorized as to how it is operated.
 A liner will have a regular run and operate to a schedule. The scheduled operation requires that such ships are better equipped to deal with causes of potential delay such as bad weather. They are generally higher powered than tramp ships with better seakeeping qualities, thus they are significantly more expensive to build. Liners are typically built for passenger and container operation though past common uses also included mail and general cargo.
 A tramp (trader) has no fixed run but will go wherever a suitable cargo takes it. Thus a ship and crew may be chartered from the ship owner to fetch a cargo of grain from Canada to Latvia, the ship may then be required to carry a cargo of coal from Britain to Melanesia. Bulk carriers and some cruise ships are examples of ships built to operate in this manner.

Ships and watercraft  

Ships and other watercraft are used for maritime transport. Types can be distinguished by propulsion, size or cargo type.  Recreational or educational craft still use wind power, while some smaller craft use internal combustion engines to drive one or more propellers, or in the case of jet boats, an inboard water jet.  In shallow-draft areas, such as the Everglades, some craft, such as the hovercraft, are propelled by large pusher-prop fans.

Most modern merchant ships can be placed in one of a few categories, such as:

Typical in-transit times 
A cargo ship sailing from a European port to a US one will typically take 10–12 days depending on water currents and other factors. In order to make container ship transport more economical, ship operators sometimes reduce cruising speed, thereby increasing transit time, to reduce fuel consumption, a strategy referred to as "slow steaming".

History

Professional mariners

A ship's complement can be divided into four categories: 
 The deck department
 The engine department
 The steward's department
 Other.

Deck department

 Officer positions in the deck department include but not limited to the Master and his Chief, Second, and Third officers. The official classifications for unlicensed members of the deck department are Able Seaman and Ordinary Seaman.

A common deck crew for a ship includes:
 (1) Chief Officer/Chief Mate
 (1) Second Officer/Second Mate
 (1) Third Officer/Third Mate
 (1) Boatswain
 (2–6) Able Seamen
 (0–2) Ordinary Seamen

A deck cadet is a person who is carrying out mandatory sea time to achieve their officer of the watch certificate. Their time on board is spent learning the operations and tasks of everyday life on a merchant vessel.

Engine department

A ship's engine department consists of the members of a ship's crew that operate and maintain the propulsion and other systems on board the vessel. Engine staff also deal with the "Hotel" facilities on board, notably the sewage, lighting, air conditioning and water systems. They deal with bulk fuel transfers, and require training in firefighting and first aid, as well as in dealing with the ship's boats and other nautical tasks- especially with cargo loading/discharging gear and safety systems, though the specific cargo discharge function remains the responsibility of deck officers and deck workers. On LPG and LNG tankers, however, a cargo engineer works with the deck department during cargo operations, as well as being a watchkeeping engineer.

A common engine crew for a ship includes:
 (1) Chief engineer
 (1) Second engineer / first assistant engineer
 (1) Third engineer / second assistant engineer
 (1 or 2) Fourth engineer / third assistant engineer
 (0–2) Fifth engineer / junior engineer
 (1–3) Oiler (unlicensed qualified rating)
 (0–3) Greaser (unlicensed qualified rating)
 (1–5) Entry-level rating (such as wiper (occupation), utilityman, etc.)

Many American ships also carry a motorman. Other possible positions include machinist, electrician, refrigeration engineer, and tankerman. Engine cadets are engineer trainees who are completing sea time necessary before they can obtain a watchkeeping license.

Steward's department

A typical steward's department for a cargo ship would be composed of a Chief Steward, a chief cook, and a Steward's Assistant. All three positions are typically filled by unlicensed personnel. The chief steward directs, instructs, and assigns personnel performing such functions as preparing and serving meals; cleaning and maintaining officers' quarters and steward department areas; and receiving, issuing, and inventorying stores. On large passenger vessels, the Catering Department is headed by the Chief Purser and managed by Assistant Pursers. Although they enjoy the benefits of having officer rank, they generally progress through the ranks to become pursers. Under the pursers are the department heads – such as chief cook, head waiter, head barman etc. They are responsible for the administration of their own areas.

The chief steward also plans menus and compiles supply, overtime, and cost control records. They may requisition or purchase stores and equipment. They may bake bread, rolls, cakes, pies, and pastries. A chief steward's duties may overlap with those of the Steward's Assistant, the chief cook, and other Steward's Department crewmembers.

In the United States Merchant Marine, a chief steward must have a Merchant Mariner's Document issued by the United States Coast Guard. Because of international law, conventions, and agreements, all chief cooks who sail internationally are similarly documented by their respective countries.

Other departments

Staff officer positions on a ship, including Junior Assistant Purser, Senior Assistant Purser, Purser, Chief Purser, Medical Doctor, Professional Nurse, Marine Physician Assistant, and hospital corpsman, are considered administrative positions and are therefore regulated by Certificates of Registry issued by the United States Coast Guard.  Pilots are also merchant marine officers and are licensed by the Coast Guard. Formerly, there was also a radio department, headed by a chief radio officer and supported by a number of radio officers. Since the introduction of GMDSS (Satellite communications) and the subsequent exemptions from carrying radio officers if the vessel is so equipped, this department has fallen away, although many ships do still carry specialist radio officers, particularly passenger vessels. Many radio officers became 'electro-technical officers', and transferred into the engine department.

Life at sea
Mariners spend much of their life beyond the reach of land. They sometimes face dangerous conditions at sea or on lakes – the fishing port of Gloucester, Massachusetts has a seaside memorial listing over 10,000 fishermen who lost their lives to the sea, and the Great Lakes have seen over 10,000 lost vessels since the 1800s, yet men and women still go to sea. For some, the attraction is a life unencumbered with the restraints of life ashore. Seagoing adventure and a chance to see the world also appeal to many seafarers. Whatever the calling, those who live and work at sea invariably confront social isolation.

Findings by the Seafarer's International Research Center indicate a leading cause of mariners leaving the industry is "almost invariably because they want to be with their families." U.S. merchant ships typically do not allow family members to accompany seafarers on voyages. Industry experts increasingly recognize isolation, stress, and fatigue as occupational hazards. Advocacy groups such as International Labour Organization, a United Nations agency, and the Nautical Institute are seeking improved international standards for mariners. Satellite phones have improved communication and efficiency aboard sea-faring ships. This technology has contributed to crew welfare, although both equipment and fees are expensive.

Ocean voyages are steeped in routine. Maritime tradition dictates that each day be divided into six four-hour periods. Three groups of watch keepers from the engine and deck departments work four hours on then have eight hours off watch keeping. However, there are many overtime jobs to be done daily. This cycle repeats endlessly, 24 hours a day while the ship is at sea. Members of the steward department typically are day workers who put in at least eight-hour shifts. Operations at sea, including repairs, safeguarding against piracy, securing cargo, underway replenishment, and other duties provide opportunities for overtime work. Service aboard ships typically extends for months at a time, followed by protracted shore leave. However, some seamen secure jobs on ships they like and stay aboard for years.

The quick turnaround of many modern ships, spending only a few hours in port, limits a seafarer's free-time ashore. Moreover, some foreign seamen entering U.S. ports from a watch list of 25 countries face restrictions on shore leave due to maritime security concerns. However, shore leave restrictions while in U.S. ports impact American seamen as well. For example, the International Organization of Masters, Mates & Pilots notes a trend of U.S. shipping terminal operators restricting seamen from traveling from the ship to the terminal gate. Furthermore, in cases where transit is allowed, special "security fees" are at times assessed.

Such restrictions on shore leave, coupled with reduced time in port, translate into longer periods at sea. Mariners report that extended periods at sea living and working with shipmates, who for the most part are strangers, takes getting used to. At the same time, there is an opportunity to meet people from other ethnic and cultural backgrounds. Recreational opportunities have improved aboard some U.S. ships, which may feature gyms and day rooms for watching movies, swapping sea stories, and other activities. And in some cases, especially tankers, it is possible for a mariner to be accompanied by members of his family.  However, a mariner's off-duty time is largely a solitary affair, pursuing hobbies, reading, writing letters, and sleeping.

On modern ocean-going vessels, typically registered with a flag of convenience, life has changed immensely in the last 20 years. Most large vessels include a gym and often a swimming pool for use by the crew. Since the Exxon Valdez incident, the focus of leisure time activity has shifted from having officer and crew bars, to simply having lounge-style areas where officers or crew can sit to watch movies. With many companies now providing TVs and DVD players in cabins, and enforcing strict smoking policies, it is not surprising that the bar is now a much quieter place on most ships. In some instances games consoles are provided for the officers and crew. The officers enjoy a much higher standard of living on board ocean-going vessels.

Crews are generally poorly paid, poorly qualified and have to complete contracts of approximately 9 months before returning home on leave. They often come from countries where the average industrial wage is still very low, such as the Philippines or India. Officers however, come from all over the world and it is not uncommon to mix the nationality of the officers on board ships. Officers are often the recipients of university degrees and have completed vast amounts of training in order to reach their rank. Officers benefit e.g. by having larger, more comfortable cabins and table service for their meals.

Contracts average at the 4 month mark for officers, with generous leave. Most ocean-going vessels now operate an unmanned engine room system allowing engineers to work days only. The engine room is computer controlled by night, although the duty engineer will make inspections during unmanned operation. Engineers work in a hot, humid, noisy atmosphere. Communication in the engine room is therefore by hand signals and lip-reading, and good teamwork often stands in place of any communication at all.

Environmental impact 

The environmental impact of shipping includes greenhouse gas emissions, acoustic, and oil pollution. The International Maritime Organization (IMO) estimates that Carbon dioxide emissions from shipping were equal to 2.2% of the global human-made emissions in 2012 and expects them to rise 50 to 250 percent by 2050 if no action is taken.

Infrastructure 

For a port to efficiently send and receive cargo, it requires infrastructure: docks, bollards, pilings, cranes, bulk cargo handling equipment, and so on – equipment and organization supporting the role of the facilities. From pier to pier these may differ, one dock handling intermodal transport needs (container-ships linked to rail by cranes); another bulk handling capabilities (such as conveyors, elevators, tanks, pumps) for loading and unloading bulk cargoes like grain, coal, or fuels. Others may be outfitted as passenger terminals or for mixed mode operations.

Generally, Harbors, seaports and marinas all host watercraft, and consist of components such as piers, wharfs, docks and roadsteads.

See also

 Electric ship
 European Union shipping law
 Glossary of nautical terms (A-L)
 Glossary of nautical terms (M-Z)
 List of cargo types
 List of maritime colleges
 List of merchant marine capacity by country
 List of sailors
 List of ship companies
 Lloyd's War Medal for Bravery at Sea
 The Marine Society
 Maritime history
 Maritime safety
 Merchant vessel
 MV Yara Birkeland
 Navigation
 Navigability
 Shipping line
 SIGTTO
 UNCTAD review of maritime transport
 Waterway
 Ship watching

Notes

References
 
 
 
 
 
UNCTAD (2020). Review of Maritime Transport 2020. Retrieved from: https://unctad.org/topic/transport-and-trade-logistics/review-of-maritime-transport

External links

MarineTraffic: Global Ship Tracking Intelligence

 
Merchant navy
Shipping

Freight transport